This is a list of the songs that reached number one in Mexico in 1972, according to Billboard magazine with data provided by Radio Mil. Also included are the number-one songs according to the Record World magazine.

Chart history (Billboard)

By country of origin
Number-one artists:

Number-one compositions (it denotes the country of origin of the song's composer[s]; in case the song is a cover of another one, the name of the original composition is provided in parentheses):

Chart history (Record World)

See also
1972 in music

References

Sources
Print editions of the Billboard magazine from January 6 to December 23, 1972.

1972 in Mexico
Mexico
Lists of number-one songs in Mexico